Zarija Lambulić (born 25 May 1998) is a Serbian professional footballer who plays as a centre-back for Beroe.

Club career

Proleter Novi Sad
Born in Peć, Lambulić passed the youth academy of football club Brodarac, being a member of the generation which won Serbian youth league for the 2016–17 campaign. After overgrown youth selections, Lambulić moved in Proleter Novi Sad in summer 2017. After two opening matches he spent as a reserve sitting on the bench, he made his official debut in the 3rd fixture game of the 2017–18 Serbian First League season, replacing Danilo Nikolić in 24 minute of the match against Radnički Pirot on 3 September 2017. Several days later, he signed his first three-year professional contract with the club. He scored his first senior goal in 2–0 home victory over Radnički Kragujevac on 11 November 2017. Lambulić collected 12 Serbian First League appearances at total until the end of 2017, missing the last fixture match of the first half-season due to injury. Lambulić was also elected in top 11 Serbian First League footballers for the first half-season. During the spring half-season, Lambulić played 2 matches under Nenad Vanić, both as a back-up player. Winning the top place in the Serbian First League for the 2017–18 campaign, Lambulić made a promotion to the top tier with Proleter. He made his Serbian SuperLiga debut in opening match of the 2018–19 season, against Radnički Niš at the Čair Stadium, on 22 July 2018.

On 4 January 2023, Lambulić signed for First League club Beroe.

International career
Lambulić got his first call into the Serbian under-19 selection in late 2016. He made his debut for the team in a friendly match against Italy on 14 December 2017 under coach Milan Kosanović. Lambulić scored his first goal in 3–3 draw to Bosnia and Herzegovina on 9 March 2017. He also made a single appearance in the elite qualification round, failing to qualify to 2017 UEFA European Under-19 Championship.

Playing style
Lambulić is a right-legged defender, who usually operates as a centre-back. Playing with Brodarac, Lambulić promoted as one of the defenders in the youth league with the best prospects, and also called into the national under-19 team. As a 1.93 m tall player, he is labelled as dominant in positioning, having good heading abilities respectively. While in youth, Lambulić has also affirmed as a free kick taker.

Career statistics

Club

Honours
Proleter Novi Sad
Serbian First League: 2017–18

References

External links
Zarija Lambulić at serbiacorner.com

1998 births
Living people
Sportspeople from Peja
Kosovo Serbs
Association football defenders
Serbian footballers
Serbian expatriate footballers
Expatriate footballers in Belarus
Expatriate footballers in Bosnia and Herzegovina
Expatriate footballers in Bulgaria
Serbia youth international footballers
FK Proleter Novi Sad players
Serbian First League players
FC Shakhtyor Soligorsk players
HŠK Zrinjski Mostar players
FK Zlatibor Čajetina players
FK Mladost Lučani players
PFC Beroe Stara Zagora players
Premier League of Bosnia and Herzegovina players